José Sarmiento de Valladares Arines-Troncoso de Romay, 1st Duke of Atrisco, jure uxoris Count of Moctezuma, GE (May 1643 in San Roman de Saxamonde, Galicia, Spain – September 10, 1708 in Madrid) was viceroy of New Spain from December 18, 1696 to November 3, 1701.

Career 
On his arrival in New Spain, he met with his viceregal predecessor, Bishop Juan Ortega y Montañés at Otumba, on the road from Veracruz to Mexico City. He entered the capital incognito on the afternoon of December 18, 1696 and was sworn in at 7 o'clock that evening, before the Audiencia. On his formal entrance into Mexico City on February 2, 1697 his horse fell, to the great amusement of the crowd.

He did what he could to help the population through the famine of 1697. He ordered that supplies of maize and wheat be kept in the public granaries to protect against future famines, and he ordered the storing of quantities of other provisions as well. He ordered that the Philippines ship mercury to New Spain, for use in the silver mines. Many mines had been closed for lack of mercury to extract the silver. He legalized the consumption of the mildly alcoholic drink pulque by the natives.

He worked to restore the viceregal palace, partially destroyed in the riots and fire of 1692. He was able to occupy it on May 25, 1697. One of his daughters, Fausta Dominga, died shortly thereafter, of smallpox.

In 1700 he established the night watch in Mexico City to combat crime. The city was divided into eight wards, and a constable was placed in charge of the night watch in each ward. Offenders were to be whipped publicly on the first offense and branded on the back on the second. For a third offense the penalty was the loss of an ear. By order of March 6, 1700, assailants on the Camino Real were to suffer death. Sarmiento y Valladares also ordered that criminals and delinquents be transported to Puerto Rico.

A ship arrived in Veracruz on March 6, 1701 carrying the news of the death of King Charles II of Spain on November 1, 1700. Charles II left no heir. The War of the Spanish Succession, between Spain and France on the one hand and Austria, England and Holland on the other, began, to determine his successor. Sarmiento y Valladares was publicly known as a supporter of the Habsburg claims to the Spanish throne, but the Bourbons were in control there. The viceroy was removed from office and ordered to return to Spain. Bishop Juan Ortega y Montañés was once again named interim viceroy.

Nevertheless, upon his return to Spain Sarmiento y Valladares received a pension and many honors, among them the titles of duke of Atlixco and grande of Spain. He received the latter title on November 25, 1704. He died in Madrid in 1708.

Personal life 
He was married to María Jerónima Moctezuma y Jofre de Loaiza, third Countess de Moctezuma, a descendant of the last Aztec emperor. It was through her that he received his title. She bore him two daughters but then died. Thereafter he married a granddaughter of the Marquess de Villamanrique. His second wife accompanied him to New Spain.

His descendants continue to bear the title Duke of Atrisco in Spain, currently held by Adelaida Barón y Carral, whilst another branch (Romay) resides in Mexico and is represented by Ricardo de Romay y Hernandez-Chazaro, 47th Lord of Cadro y Monterroso.

References
 "Sarmiento y Valladares, José," Enciclopedia de México, v. 12. Mexico City, 1988.
 García Puron, Manuel, México y sus gobernantes, v. 1. Mexico City: Joaquín Porrua, 1984.
 Orozco L., Fernando, Fechas Históricas de México. Mexico City: Panorama Editorial, 1988, .
 Orozco Linares, Fernando, Gobernantes de México. Mexico City: Panorama Editorial, 1985, .

1643 births
1708 deaths
Viceroys of New Spain
Counts of Spain
Dukes of Spain
Spanish colonial governors and administrators
Knights of Santiago
Grandees of Spain